L'allenatore nel pallone 2  is a 2008 Italian comedy film directed by Sergio Martino. The film is a sequel of L'allenatore nel pallone.

Plot
The famous Italian football coach Oronzo Canà has retired to a villa in Apulia. Now, old and tired, he is enjoying a quiet life there, cultivating his vineyard, when suddenly he is summoned to Milan, in northern Italy. There the elderly chairman of a great Lombard ("Longobarda") club is suffering from dementia and has lost his powers of judgement, and the club's manager has been fired. He has decided to bring back Oronzo Canà as trainer, remembering him from his great football team of thirty years before, tasking him with bringing the club back to its old winning ways. Oronzo puts his trust in the intervention of a Russian billionaire who has bought the club for promotion. But it is a deception.

Cast

References

External links

2000s sports comedy films
2000s Italian-language films
2008 films
Films directed by Sergio Martino
Italian association football films
Italian sequel films
Italian sports comedy films